Rolf Ingvar Semmingsen (August 13,1908 –May 1, 1979) was a Norwegian civil servant.

He was born in Stor-Elvdal in Hedmark, Norway. He was the son of  Martin Semmingsen (1875–1964) and Anne Strand (1874–1961). Having graduated as cand.jur., he was hired as assistant secretary in the Norwegian Price Directorate (Konkurransetilsynet) in 1940. In 1946 he was promoted to assistant director under Wilhelm Thagaard. He worked as director of the cooperative Coop NKL (Norges Kooperative Landsforening) from 1949 to 1960, but returned to the Price Directorate to serve as director from 1961 to 1977. In 1994 the Norwegian Price Directorate was restructured as the Norwegian Competition Authority. 

He was married to historian Ingrid Semmingsen (1910-1995).

References

1908 births
1979 deaths
People from Stor-Elvdal
Directors of government agencies of Norway
Norwegian civil servants